The 1998 Wyoming Cowboys football team represented the University of Wyoming in the 1998 NCAA Division I-A football season. The Cowboys were led by second-year head coach Dana Dimel and played their home games at War Memorial Stadium in Laramie, Wyoming. They finished the season with an 8–3 record overall and a 6–2 record in the Western Athletic Conference to finish 2nd in the Mountain Division. Despite a solid overall record, the Cowboys were not invited to play in a bowl game. This was Wyoming's last season in the WAC before they joined the Mountain West Conference.

Schedule

Source:

References

Wyoming
Wyoming Cowboys football seasons
Wyoming Cowboys football